Ophius or Ophious may refer to:
Of, Turkey, a town
Ophis (river), a river